James Francis Kelleher  (October 2, 1930 – June 2, 2013) was a Canadian politician and retired senator.

Born in Sault Ste. Marie, Ontario, he received a B.A. degree in 1952 from Queen's University and an LL.B. degree in 1956 from Osgoode Hall Law School. Kelleher was first elected to the House of Commons of Canada in the 1984 election as the Progressive Conservative Member of Parliament for Sault Ste. Marie, Ontario.

He was appointed minister of international trade in the first cabinet of prime minister Brian Mulroney. In 1986, he became solicitor general as the result of a cabinet shuffle, and remained so until his defeat in the 1988 election.

On September 23, 1990, Kelleher was appointed to the Senate of Canada on Mulroney's recommendation. He retired from the upper house upon his seventy-fifth birthday, October 2, 2005, due to the Senate's mandatory retirement rules.

He died of heart problems in 2013.

Archives 
There is a James Kelleher fonds at Library and Archives Canada.

References

External links
 

1930 births
2013 deaths
Lawyers in Ontario
Canadian senators from Ontario
Conservative Party of Canada senators
Members of the House of Commons of Canada from Ontario
Members of the King's Privy Council for Canada
Progressive Conservative Party of Canada MPs
Progressive Conservative Party of Canada senators
People from Sault Ste. Marie, Ontario
Queen's University at Kingston alumni
Osgoode Hall Law School alumni
Solicitors General of Canada
Members of the 24th Canadian Ministry
Canadian King's Counsel
21st-century Canadian politicians